Maulana Muhammad Rehmat Ullah is a Pakistani politician who was a Member of the Provincial Assembly of the Punjab, between 1985 and May 2018.

Early life and education
He was born on 27 January 1935.

He has received Islamic education.

Political career
He was elected to the National Assembly of Pakistan from Constituency NA-64 (Jhang-II) in 1985 Pakistani general election.

He ran for the seat of the National Assembly from Constituency NA-67 (Jhang-II) as a candidate of Islami Jamhoori Ittehad (IJI) in 1988 Pakistani general election but was unsuccessful. He received 42,107 votes and lost the seat to Abida Hussain After 1988 Pakistani general election he elected in by election as MNA . candidate of PPP Muhammad ali shah was defeated by him .

He was re-elected to the National Assembly from Constituency NA-67 (Jhang-II) as a candidate of IJI in 1990 Pakistani general election. He secured 57,263 votes and defeated his closest contender Syed Asad Hayat, a candidate of the Pakistan Democratic Alliance (PDA).

He ran for the seat of the National Assembly from Constituency NA-67 (Jhang-II) as a candidate of Pakistan Muslim League (N) (PML-N) in 1993 Pakistani general election but was unsuccessful. He received 49,152 votes and lost the seat to candidate, of the PDA, Syed Asad Hayat.

He was re-elected to the National Assembly from Constituency NA-67 (Jhang-II) as a candidate of PML-N in 1997 Pakistani general election. He secured 52,911 votes and defeated Syed Asad Hayat, a candidate of the Pakistan Peoples Party (PPP).

He ran for the seat of the National Assembly from Constituency NA-86 (Jhang-I) as a candidate of Muttahida Majlis-e-Amal (MMA) in 2002 Pakistani general election but was unsuccessful. He received 29,336 votes and lost the seat to Mohammad Tahir Shah, a candidate of Pakistan Muslim League (Q) (PML-Q). In the same election, he ran for the seat of the Provincial Assembly of the Punjab as an independent candidate from Constituency PP-74 (Jhang—II) but was unsuccessful. He received 111 votes and lost the seat to Syed Hassan Murtaza, a candidate of PPP.

He ran for the seat of the Provincial Assembly of the Punjab as an independent candidate from Constituency PP-74 (Jhang-II) in 2008 Pakistani general election but was unsuccessful. He received 31,722 votes and lost the seat to Syed Hassan Murtaza, a candidate of PPP.

He was elected to the Provincial Assembly of the Punjab as a candidate of Pakistan Muslim League (N) (PML-N) from Constituency PP-74 (Chiniot-II) in 2013 Pakistani general election. He received 38,230 votes and defeated Syed Hassan Murtaza, a candidate of PPP.

References

Living people
Punjab MPAs 2013–2018
1935 births
Pakistan Muslim League (N) politicians
Pakistani MNAs 1985–1988
Pakistani MNAs 1990–1993
Pakistani MNAs 1997–1999